Hating Alison Ashley may refer to:
 Hating Alison Ashley (novel), a 1984 novel
 Hating Alison Ashley (film), a 2005 film based on the novel